Dugald William Saunders is an Australian politician. He has been a member of the New South Wales Legislative Assembly since 2019, representing Dubbo for the Nationals. Saunders has served as the Minister for Agriculture and the Minister for Western New South Wales in the Perrottet ministry since December 2021.

Before entering politics, Saunders had a long career in broadcasting. He was a commentator at the 2000 Sydney Olympic Games and was the ABC Local Radio morning presenter in Dubbo for ten years.

References

 

Year of birth missing (living people)
Living people
National Party of Australia members of the Parliament of New South Wales
Members of the New South Wales Legislative Assembly
21st-century Australian politicians